IR Tanger or Ittihad Riadi Tanger (lit.'Sports Union of Tangier'), known as Ittihad Riadi Tanger, abbreviation IRT, is a Moroccan football club based in Tangier, that competes in Botola, the top flight of Moroccan football.

The club was founded initially in 1936 as Unión Deportiva España de Tánger (UDET); After the independence of Morocco in 1956, the club changed the name to Unión Deportiva de Tánger or UDT until 1983 where the club underwent structural changes following merging of several local teams.

Ittihad Riadi Tanger also has basketball, volleyball, and handball teams, supporting wide range of sports, as well. Their home games are hosted at  Ibn Batouta Stadium (Stade de Marchan was their former home ground before it was demolished and rebuilt as a park).

IR Tanger has a large fan base in northern Morocco, especially in the Tanger-Tetouan-Al Hoceima region, where it is the most relatively big club.

History
IR Tanger was set up by a fusion of several clubs in 1983. Among these were Ittihad Renaissance de Tangier ("United Reborn of Tangier") and other clubs who were playing at the second Moroccan league divisions at the time. The fusion resulted in the formation of a prominent club that stands out in Tangier, especially in the football pitch, without significant rivalries (Wydad Juventud is another sports club operating in Tangier, but with less public attention, alongside Maghreb Aqsa Club, the oldest existing club participating in the third Division).

In the early '90s, IR Tangier was one of the most dominating clubs in the Botola, delivering some quality football. However, the team could not capitalize, failing to win any trophies in the process, although they came close in the 1989–90 season when they finished as runners-up. The 1989 season was considered by many to be their best ever, as the team piled up victory after another crushing most of the Botola's heavyweights at that time, infamously beating Raja Casablanca 3-1 and Maghreb de Fès 3–0.

Moving on to the later part of the '90s, IR Tanger failed to achieve anything besides maintaining itself in the Botola. They ended up getting relegated twice before the dawn of the new millennium, finishing rock bottom on the table during the 1995–96 and 1997–98 seasons.

The 2000–01 season would witness a new Ittihad Tangier, under new management and technical supervision, Coach Omar Raiss joined the club in July 2000 and managed to transform the club. IR Tanger's attack became more efficient, scoring more than 50 goals that season, while its defense was the strongest in the GNF 2. These efforts were crowned with a well-deserved promotion, the overall results looked comforting, and IR Tanger's future seemed bright.

The post-promotion era, however, didn't turn out as glorious as it seemed would. A load of technical and staff changes influenced the team's results, and throughout the early 2000s, the only notable achievement was a Throne Cup semi-final in the 2005–06 season, under governance of Abdelhadi Sektioui, the following season would become IR Tanger's last in the Botola, starting what the fans refer to as their "dark ages" in the 2nd division, an era that lasted eight long years, during which IR Tanger constantly faced risks of dissolution due to administrative mistakes and financial crises, and every single time they would be rescued by fans and the faithful ultras group.

In parallel, the results were as poor as ever, the team would almost always finish middle or bottom table, never able to go past the Round of 32 in the Throne Cup, and even a prevented historical relegation to the Third Division during the 2012–13 season. It seemed obvious that Tangerian football was suffering and the ultras group mobilized fans throughout the now-metropolis, requesting new management and a complete renovation of the club via protests and marches.

These efforts would later on yield many achievements, after setting up a new directive committee, the club nearly made it back to the Botola during the 2013–14 season, and with a series of transfers and the arrival of Coach Mohamed Amine Benhachem, the team cruised through the 2014–15 season, losing only twice and finishing first by a five-point lead. The performances made that season were phenomenal and attracted the attention of the entire Moroccan football scene, as everyone welcomed the mighty blues back where they belonged.

In 2015–16 season, the team made a comeback to the Botola Pro after eight years in the second division. The club contracted with many local and foreign players where they made a great show under the spotlight of the Botola with promising results, finishing third on their first season back from promotion and therefore qualifying to an African competition for the first time in the history of the club.

Home ground

The club hosted their home matches in the government-built Stade de Marchan, with a capacity of 15,000 seats. In 2011 the club moved to a new international stadium with a capacity of 45,000 (and a potential for a maximum of 75,000 seats) called Ibn Batouta Stadium. This stadium is planned to host the 2012 African Cup U21, the 2015 Africa Cup of Nations and some matches of the 2013 FIFA Club World Cup and the 2014 FIFA Club World Cup.
The old grounds of Marchan Stadium hosted several historical moments like the match between IR Tangier VS Wydad Casablanca in the 1989–90 season for the first place of Botola and an amical match in Ibn Batouta Stadium with Atlético Madrid.

In 2015 and 2016 the grand stadium of Batouta had his record attendance estimated over than 50,000. the stadium is notorious throughout Morocco and all over the Arab world for the masses of supporters that show up each game ( an average of 35,000 per game). which makes the club's finances rely mainly on ticket income.

Crest and shirt
The official crest was planned by the founders and decided in a democratic process. It shows the full name of the club and the year of foundation, but different sport departments of the club  replace the year with the icon of the sport. The Blue lining is in honour of the north region. The icon on the right is the symbol of Tangier.

The official home shirts are similar to the crest, colored blue and white. IRT's traditional away colors change every season but are usually based on light blue with a sponsor's logo on the top.
The shirts are made by King Sports and Joma. However, the club signed a sponsorship deal with local sportswear manufacturer Bang sport once it
got promoted to the first division.

Kit suppliers and shirt sponsors

Supporters and rivalries

The club has an ultras group Ultras Hercules, who were founded in 2007, there was actually an older ultra called Ultras Tanger founded in 2003, but there is no remaining of this group since it was extended to form Ultras Hercules, even though there are still a few existing groups on Facebook, Skyblog and Blogger mainly.
 
The rivalry's moreover relative to their neighbour club of Tetouan which its characterises with an extensive match, we distinguish other big rivalries as Wydad, Raja and KAC supporters.

The Northern Derby
Their biggest rival is without a doubt Moghreb Tétouan, the first club of the neighboring city, Tétouan, it is one of the most awaited matches of the first division league, especially among northern Morocco as the two famous clubs of the region facing off each other. This derby is always attended by a great number of people due to its value and importance among supporters.
There is another match considered sometimes as a Derby of the region along with Chabab Rif Al Hoceima, but it is not as important as Moghreb Tétouan.

Season results

League and cup

African competitions

Arab competition

Notes
 PR: Preliminary round
 1R: First round
 PO: Play-off round

Honours 

 Botola
Winners: 2017–18
Runner-up: 1989–90
 Botola 2
Winners: 2000–01, 2014–15

Players

Current squad

From youth squad

Other players under contract

Out on loan

Former players

Managers

Current technical staff 
{| class="wikitable" style="text-align:center;"
|-
!Position
!Name
|-
| style="text-align:left;"|First team head coach
| style="text-align:left;"| Ezzaki Badou
|-
| style="text-align:left;"|Assistant coach
| style="text-align:left;"| Hassan Fadil
|-
| style="text-align:left;"|Fitness coach
| style="text-align:left;"| Rachid Blej
|-
| style="text-align:left;"|Goalkeeping coach
| style="text-align:left;"| Mohammed Bestara
|-
| style="text-align:left;"|Performance analyst
| style="text-align:left;"| Ahmed Zekhnini
|-
| style="text-align:left;"|Club doctor
| style="text-align:left;"| Houssine Azizi
|-
| style="text-align:left;"|Physiotherapists
| style="text-align:left;"| Abdelmonhem Nafie
|-
| style="text-align:left;"|Delegate
| style="text-align:left;"| Ali Haddou
|-
| style="text-align:left;"|Hope's team coach
| style="text-align:left;"| Khalid Bahid
|-
| style="text-align:left;"|Hope's team assistant coach
| style="text-align:left;"| Youssef Sekour
|-
| style="text-align:left;"|Formation center manager
| style="text-align:left;"| Abdelhakim Ben Saddik

Partnerships 

  CR Belouizdad (2017)
  RCD Espanyol (2018)
  CD Leganés (2019)

See also
UD España
EHA Tánger

References

External links

 
Football clubs in Morocco
Sport in Tangier
1983 establishments in Morocco
Sports clubs in Morocco
Association football clubs established in 1983
Organizations based in Tangier